The 2014–15 Ohio State Buckeyes men's basketball team represented Ohio State University in the 2014–15 NCAA Division I men's basketball season.  Their head coach was Thad Matta, in his 11th season with the Buckeyes. The team played its home games at Value City Arena in Columbus, Ohio and were members of the Big Ten Conference. They finished the season 24–11, 11–7 in Big Ten play to finish in sixth place. They advanced to the quarterfinals of the Big Ten tournament where they lost to Michigan State. They received an at-large bid to the NCAA tournament where they defeated VCU in the second round before losing in the third round to Arizona.

Before the season

Previous season
The Buckeye finished the season with 25-10 overall, 10-8 in Big Ten play for a fifth-place finish. They lost in the semifinals of the 2014 Big Ten Conference men's basketball tournament to Michigan. They were invited to the 2014 NCAA Division I men's basketball tournament as a 6th seed in the south region which they were upset by Dayton in the second round 60-59.

Departures

Incoming transfers

Recruiting

Roster

Schedule

|-
!colspan=9 style="background:#B31021; color:white;"| Exhibition

|-
!colspan=9 style="background:#B31021; color:white;"| Non-Conference Regular season

|-
!colspan=9 style="background:#B31021; color:white;"| Big Ten Regular season

|-
!colspan=9 style="background:#B31021; color:white;"| Big Ten tournament

|-
!colspan=9 style="background:#B31021; color:white;"| NCAA tournament

Source:

Rankings

References

Ohio State Buckeyes men's basketball seasons
Ohio State
Ohio State
Ohio State Buckeyes
Ohio State Buckeyes